Eylaki or Ailaki or Ilaki or Eylaqi may refer to:
 Eylaki-ye Bala
 Eylaki-ye Pain